East Francia or the Kingdom of the East Franks was a successor state of Charlemagne's empire ruled by the Carolingian dynasty until 911. It was created through the Treaty of Verdun (843) which divided the former empire into three kingdoms. 

The east–west division with the Treaty of Verdun in 843, enforced by the Germanic-Latin language split, "gradually hardened into the establishment of separate kingdoms", with East Francia becoming (or being) the Kingdom of Germany and West Francia becoming the Kingdom of France.

Terminology
The term orientalis Francia originally referred to Franconia and orientales Franci to its inhabitants, the ethnic Franks living east of the Rhine. The use of the term in a broader sense, to refer to the eastern kingdom, was an innovation of Louis the German's court. Since eastern Francia could be identified with old Austrasia, the Frankish heartland, Louis's choice of terminology hints at his ambitions. Under his grandson, Arnulf of Carinthia, the terminology was largely dropped and the kingdom, when it was referred to by name, was simply Francia.

When it was necessary, as in the Treaty of Bonn (921) with the West Franks, the "eastern" qualifier appeared. Henry I refers to himself as rex Francorum orientalium, "king of the East Franks", in the treaty. By the 12th century, the historian Otto of Freising, in using the Carolingian terminology, had to explain that the "eastern kingdom of the Franks" (orientale Francorum regnum) was "now called the kingdom of the Germans" (regnum Teutonicorum).

History

In August 843, after three years of civil war following the death of emperor Louis the Pious on 20 June 840, the Treaty of Verdun was signed by his three sons and heirs. The division of lands was largely based on the Meuse, Scheldt, Saone and Rhone rivers. While the eldest son Lothair I kept the imperial title and the kingdom of Middle Francia, Charles the Bald received West Francia and Louis the German received the eastern portion of mostly Germanic-speaking lands: the Duchy of Saxony, Austrasia, Alamannia, the Duchy of Bavaria, and the March of Carinthia.

The contemporary East Frankish Annales Fuldenses describes the kingdom being "divided in three" and Louis "acceding to the eastern part". The West Frankish Annales Bertiniani describe the extent of Louis's lands: "at the assigning of portions, Louis obtained all the land beyond the Rhine river, but on this side of the Rhine also the cities of Speyer, Worms and Mainz with their counties". The kingdom of West Francia went to Louis's younger half-brother Charles the Bald, and between their realms a kingdom of Middle Francia, incorporating Italy, was given to their elder brother, the Emperor Lothair I.

While Eastern Francia contained about a third of the traditional Frankish heartland of Austrasia, the rest consisted mostly of lands annexed to the Frankish empire between the fifth and the eighth century. These included the duchies of Alamannia, Bavaria, Saxony and Thuringia, as well as the northern and eastern marches with the Danes and Slavs. The contemporary chronicler Regino of Prüm wrote that the "different people" (diversae nationes populorum) of East Francia, mostly Germanic- and Slavic-speaking, could be "distinguished from each other by race, customs, language and laws" (genere moribus lingua legibus).

In 869 Lotharingia was divided between West and East Francia under the Treaty of Meersen. The short lived Middle Francia turned out to be the theatre of Franco-German wars up until the 20th century.
All the Frankish lands were briefly reunited by Charles the Fat, but in 888 he was deposed by nobles and in East Francia Arnulf of Carinthia was elected king.
The increasing weakness of royal power in East Francia meant that dukes of Bavaria, Swabia, Franconia, Saxony and Lotharingia turned from appointed nobles into hereditary rulers of their territories. Kings increasingly had to deal with regional rebellions.

In 911 Saxon, Franconian, Bavarian and Swabian nobles no longer followed the tradition of electing someone from the Carolingian dynasty as a king to rule over them and on 10 November, 911 elected one of their own (Conrad I) as the new king. Because Conrad I was one of the dukes, he found it very hard to establish his authority over them. Duke Henry of Saxony was in rebellion against Conrad I until 915 and struggle against Arnulf, Duke of Bavaria cost Conrad I his life. On his deathbed Conrad I chose Henry of Saxony as the most capable successor. This kingship changed from Franks to Saxons, who had suffered greatly during the conquests of Charlemagne. Henry, who was elected to kingship by only Saxons and Franconians at Fritzlar, had to subdue other dukes and concentrated on creating a state apparatus which was fully utilized by his son and successor Otto I. By his death in July 936 Henry had prevented collapse of royal power as was happening in West Francia and left a much stronger kingdom to his successor Otto I. After Otto I was crowned as the Emperor in Rome in 962 the era of the Holy Roman Empire began.

Kingship
The regalia of the Carolingian empire had been divided by Louis the Pious on his deathbed between his two faithful sons, Charles the Bald and Lothair. Louis the German, then in rebellion, received nothing of the crown jewels or liturgical books associated with Carolingian kingship. Thus the symbols and rituals of East Frankish kingship were created from scratch.

From an early date the East Frankish kingdom had a more formalised notion of royal election than West Francia. Around 900, a liturgy (ordo) for the coronation of a king, called the early German ordo, was written for a private audience. It required the coronator to ask the "designated prince" (princeps designatus) whether he was willing to defend the church and the people and then to turn and ask the people whether they were willing to be subject to the prince and obey his laws. The latter then shouted, "Fiat, fiat!" (Let it be done!), an act that later became known as "Recognition". This is the earliest known coronation ordo with a Recognition in it, and it was subsequently incorporated in the influential Pontificale Romano-Germanicum.

In June 888, King Arnulf of Carinthia convened a council at Mainz. In attendance were the three archbishops of the East Frankish kingdom—Wilbert of Cologne, Liutbert of Mainz and Ratbod of Trier—and the West Frankish archbishops of Reims (Fulk) and Rouen (John I) along with the bishops of Beauvais and Noyon. According to Walter Ullmann, the presence of the West Franks was on account of the "barren ecclesiastical thought" of the East, and the council proceeded to adopt West Frankish ideas of royal sacrality and anointing. It was "the first phase in the process of assimilation of the two halves of the Carolingian inheritance". In another church council at Tribur in 895, the prelates declared that Arnulf was chosen by God and not by men and Arnulf in turn swore to defend the church and its privileges from all its enemies. When Arnulf died in 899, his minor son, Louis IV, was crowned, but not anointed, and placed under the tutelage of Archbishop Hatto I of Mainz. Louis's coronation was the first in German history. When Louis died in late September 911, Duke Conrad I, then the Duke of Franconia, was elected to replace him on 10 November and he became the first German king to receive unction.

Church
The three basic services monasteries could owe to the sovereign in the Frankish realms were military service, an annual donation of money or work, and prayers for the royal family and the kingdom. Collectively, these were known by the technical term servitium regis ("king's service"). According to the evidence of the Notitia de servitio monasteriorum, a list of monasteries and the services they owed drawn up around 817, the burden of military and monetary service was more severe in west Francia than in east Francia. Only four monasteries listed as "beyond the Rhine" (ultra Rhenum) owed these services: Lorsch, Schuttern, Mondsee and Tegernsee.

List of kings
Louis the German (843–876)
Divided
Carloman in Bavaria (876–879)
Louis the Younger in Saxony (876–882) and Bavaria (879–882)
Charles the Fat in Alemannia (876–882)
Charles the Fat (882–887)
Arnulf of Carinthia (887–899)
Louis the Child (900–911)
Conrad I of Germany (911–918)
Henry the Fowler (919–936)
Otto the Great (936–973)

See also
List of Frankish kings
List of German monarchs

Notes

References
Bernard Bachrach and David Bachrach. "The Saxon Military Revolution, 912–973: Myth and Reality". Early Medieval Europe 15 (2007), 186–222. 
Bernard Bachrach and David Bachrach. "Early Saxon Frontier Warfare: Henry I, Otto I, and Carolingian Military Institutions". Journal of Medieval Military History 10 (2012), 17–60.
David Bachrach. "Exercise of Royal Power in Early Medieval Europe: The Case of Otto the Great, 936–973". Early Medieval Europe 17 (2009), 389–419. 
David Bachrach. "The Written Word in Carolingian-Style Fiscal Administration under King Henry I, 919–936". German History 28:4 (2010), 399–423. 
John W. Bernhardt. Itinerant Kingship and Royal Monasteries in Early Medieval Germany, c. 936–1075. Cambridge Studies in Medieval Life and Thought, 21. Cambridge: Cambridge University Press, 1993.  
Jim Bradbury. The Capetians: Kings of France, 987–1328. London: Hambledon Continuum, 2007.
Eric J. Goldberg. "'More Devoted to the Equipment of Battle Than the Splendor of Banquets': Frontier Kingship, Military Ritual, and Early Knighthood at the Court of Louis the German". Viator 30 (1999), 41–78. 
Eric J. Goldberg. Struggle for Empire: Kingship and Conflict Under Louis the German, 817–876. Ithaca and London: Cornell University Press, 2006.
Eckhard Müller-Mertens. "The Ottonians as Kings and Emperors". Timothy Reuter, ed. The New Cambridge Medieval History. Volume II: c.900–c.1024. Cambridge: Cambridge University Press, 1999.
Timothy Reuter. "The Medieval German Sonderweg? The Empire and its Rulers in the Highe Middle Ages". In Kings nd Kingship in Medieval Europe, ed. Anne J. Duggan (London: 1993), 179–211.
Timothy Reuter. "The Ottonian and Carolingian Tradition". In Medieval Polities and Modern Mentalities, ed. Janet L. Nelson (Cambridge: Cambridge University Press, 2006), 268–83.
Susan Reynolds. Kingdoms and Communities in Western Europe, 900–1300. Oxford: Clarendon, 1997.
Len Scales. The Shaping of German Identity: Authority and Crisis, 1245–1414. Cambridge: Cambridge University Press, 2012.
Walter Ullmann. The Carolingian Renaissance and the Idea of Kingship. London: Methuen, 1969.
Karl Ferdinand Werner. "Les nations et le sentiment national dans l'Europe médiévale". Revue Historique, 244:2 (1970), 285–304.

 
843 establishments
10th century in the Holy Roman Empire
Francia, Eastern
Medieval Austria
Medieval Switzerland
States and territories established in the 840s
States and territories disestablished in the 960s
Former kingdoms